Frolic Through the Park is the second studio album by the American thrash metal band Death Angel, released in 1988. This was the band's last full-length studio album released on Enigma Records before signing to Geffen Records in 1989.

Overview 
Frolic Through the Park marked a change in style for Death Angel and is considered by many to be one of the band's darkest works. While retaining the speed and thrash roots of its predecessor The Ultra-Violence (1987), the album saw the band implement a more experimental and diverse direction, drawing elements and influences from funk, progressive, hard rock, hardcore punk and then-current music (particularly early U2). The band would continue this experimentation on their next album, Act III (1990).

Despite being hailed as a fan favorite, and including one of their most popular songs "Bored" (in which its music video had heavy rotation on MTV's Headbangers Ball), the members of Death Angel (particularly frontman Mark Osegueda and guitarist Rob Cavestany) have been very critical of this album, including its sound and production. In the band's documentary A Thrashumentuary, Cavestany referred to Frolic Through the Park as both their "bastard album" and an "odd album". While the band has rarely performed the majority of the album's songs live since their initial disbandment in 1991, "3rd Floor" and "Bored" are the only songs from Frolic Through the Park to have appeared in their live setlists more frequently after their comeback in 2001.

Osegueda revealed in a 2003 interview that the source of the title "Why You Do This" was a line in the film The Exorcist. "Bored" was used in a scene in the 1990 movie Leatherface: The Texas Chainsaw Massacre III.

Reception and awards 

Frolic Through the Park was ranked number eight in Loudwires top ten list of "Thrash Albums NOT Released by the Big 4".

Track listing

Personnel 
Death Angel
Mark Osegueda – lead vocals
Rob Cavestany – lead guitar, backing vocals, producer
Gus Pepa – guitar
Dennis Pepa – bass, backing vocals
Andy Galeon – drums, backing vocals, producer

Additional personnel;
Bob Ross – "Shores of Sin" intro and outro

Production
Davy Vain – producer, mixing with Death Angel
Michael Rosen – engineer, mixing

References 

Death Angel albums
1988 albums
Enigma Records albums